Opera Jet a.s. was a private jet operator based in Bratislava, Slovakia. The company provided executive charter services, as well as aircraft management, brokerage, and pilot training. Its main base was M. R. Štefánik Airport, Bratislava, Slovakia.

History 
Opera Jet was formed in 2007.

Opera Jet ceased operations in November 2014.

Fleet 
The Opera Jet fleet includes the following aircraft (last update April 2014):

 1 × Cessna Citation CJ2
 2 × Cessna Citation CJ3
 1 × Beechcraft Raytheon Premier 1A

References

External links 
 Official web

Defunct airlines of Slovakia
Airlines established in 2007
Airlines disestablished in 2014
Defunct charter airlines
2014 disestablishments in Slovakia
Slovakian companies established in 2007